Quality of Life, also known as Against the Wall, is a 2004 drama film about the story of two graffiti writers in the Mission District of San Francisco. Directed by Benjamin Morgan, Quality of Life stars Lane Garrison, Brian Burnam, Luis Saguar and Mackenzie Firgens. Morgan co-wrote the screenplay with Burnam, who is a former graffiti writer. The film was shot and edited in the Mission District, home to one of the world's most active and influential graffiti scenes.

The film was shown only at film festivals in 2004 and went into limited release October 12, 2005.

Cast 
 Lane Garrison as Heir
 Brian Burnam as Vain
 Luis Saguar as Pops
 Mackenzie Firgens as Lisa
 Fred Pitts as Robert
 Andrew A. Rolfes as Officer Charles
 Tajai as Dino
 Bryna Weiss as Grandma
 Timothy Garcia as Jimmy "Tad"
 Ezra J. Stanley as Kid

Awards 
 Special Mention jury award, Berlin International Film Festival
 Best Youth Film, Stockholm International Film Festival Jr.

Soundtrack 
No official soundtrack was released, but these tracks were included in the film:

 Andre Nickatina - The Soul of a Coke Dealer
 Hi Fi Drowning - Big Spring
 Bonobo - Noctuary
 Maroons - Best Bonus Beat
 Top.R. - Soul Cancer
 Hi Fi Drowning - Atomatic
 Halou - Tube Fed
 Halou - Milkdrunk
 MR Lif - New man Theme
 Bonobo - Change Down
 Amon Tobin - Get Your Snack On
 Lifesavas - Soldierfied
 Meat Beat Manifesto feat. DJ Collage - Echo in Space Dub
 Meat Beat Manifesto - Asbestos Lead Asbestos (toxic mix)
 Calhoun (Tim Locke) - Sunken Eyes, Shakey Knees
 Modest Mouse - BROKE
 Hi Fi Drowning - Dim
 Halou - Honey Thief
 Sebadoh - License to Confuse
 Good Riddance - The Hardest Part
 Freedy Johnston - This Perfect World
 Built To Spill - Weather
 8 Stories - In Sleep

References

External links 
 
 

2004 films
2004 drama films
Mission District, San Francisco
American drama films
Hood films
2000s English-language films
2000s American films